Tegenaria mirifica is a funnel-web spider species found in Switzerland, Austria and Italy.

See also 
 List of Agelenidae species

References

External links 

mirifica
Spiders of Europe
Spiders described in 1987